Mornington Island, also known as Kunhanhaa, is an island in the Gulf of Carpentaria in the Shire of Mornington, Queensland, Australia. It is the northernmost and largest of 22 islands that form the Wellesley Islands group. The largest town, Gununa, is in the south-western part of the island.

The Lardil people are the traditional owners of the island, but there are also Kaiadilt people, who were relocated from nearby Bentinck Island, as well as people of other nations on the island. The Mornington Island Mission operated from 1914 until 1978, when it was taken over by the Queensland Government, which had proclaimed the islands an Aboriginal reserve in 1905. The Mirndiyan Gununa Aboriginal Corporation owns and manages an art centre, MIArt, and dance troupe, the Mornington Island Dancers.

Geography

The island is fringed by mangrove forests and contains 10 estuaries, all in near pristine condition.

The town of Gununa is located on the south-western end of the island overlooking the Appel Channel which separates it from Denham Island..

History
Lardil (also known as Gununa, Ladil) is an Australian Aboriginal language spoken on Mornington Island and the Northern Wellesley Islands, within the local government boundaries of the Mornington Shire. Kuku-Thaypan (also known as Gugu Dhayban, Kuku Taipan, Thaypan) is an Australian Aboriginal language spoken in Hann River, Laura  and Musgrave River and on Mornington Island, within the local government boundaries of the Cook Shire.

Lardil, who prefer to be known as Kunhanaamendaa (meaning people of Kunhanhaa), is the predominant nation on Mornington Island and they are the traditional owners of the land and surrounding seas. Kaiadilt people arrived more recently (1947–8) after being relocated from nearby Bentinck Island, and more people of other nations arrived from Doomadgee Mission in 1958.

Macassan trepangers once travelled thousands of kilometres from Sulawesi to Mornington Island and other Australian mainland destinations in search of sea cucumbers. The eastern cape of the island was named Cape Van Diemen after Anthony van Diemen. 

Commander Matthew Flinders named the island after Richard Wellesley, 1st Marquess Wellesley who was known when younger as the Earl of Mornington. Wesllesley had tried to have Flinders released from detention in Mauritius.

On 22 April 1905 all of the Wellesley islands apart from Sweers Island were proclaimed as an Aboriginal reserve, under a Protector of Aborigines appointed by the Queensland Government, Protector Howard. Bleakley was the next Protector, from 1913, but did not visit the island until 1916, by which time the first missionary (Hall) had arrived (see below for mission history).

Gununa Post Office opened by 1982.

The Mornington Island Airport was a temporary airfield used by the RAAF and allied air forces during World War II.

The Mornington Island State School opened on 28 January 1975.

In 1978, the Queensland government decided to take over control of both the Aurukun and Mornington Island missions.

Cyclones routinely hit the island. In 2000 Cyclone Steve passed directly over the island. Tropical Cyclone May passed in February 1988 and  Tropical Cyclone Bernie passed to the west in early 2002. Tropical Cyclone Fritz passed directly over the island on 12 February 2003. Severe Tropical Cyclone Harvey caused damage on the island in February, 2005.

Mornington Island Mission

The Mornington Island Mission was established in 1914 by Robert Hall, the Presbyterian assistant superintendent from Weipa Mission, who ran it until his murder in October 1917. There were also Moravian missionaries there.

Rev. Wilson took over, serving as superintendent until about 1941; mission staff were evacuated during the Second World War. James McCarthy was Superintendent from 1944 to 1948, and he imposed a strict regime of adhering to Christian customs and eroded the authority of the elders. It was during this time that all of the Kaiadilt people living on nearby Bentinck Island were moved by the missionaries onto the Mornington Island Mission. The missionaries separated the children from their parents and placed them into separate dormitories for boys and girls, while their parents built humpies around the mission. It was ten years after the relocation, completed in 1948, before one of the removed Kaiadilt woman gave birth to a child who survived. The final relocation of the people was spurred by the pollution of the islanders' water supply by seawater after it was badly damaged by a cyclone, with the relocation assisted by the Queensland Government. It was reported that some of the people had to be "induced" to move.  One of those relocated by the missionaries was artist Sally Gabori (1924–2015), who later mapped her traditional lands in her artwork at the Mornging Island Art Centre.

Belcher arrived when Taylor was superintendent, taking over as superintendent in May 1953. Belcher ran a more humane administration than his predecessors, and respected the Lardil culture.

Mission conditions were not as severe and restrictive as they were at the Doomadgee Mission, and by the late 1950s the practice of separating children from parents in dormitories had been abandoned, so many residents of Doomadgee moved to Mornington Island at this time.

In 1978 the Queensland Government took over the administration of both Aurukun and Mornington Island mission stations.

Mirndiyan Gununa Aboriginal Corporation

The Mirndiyan Gununa Aboriginal Corporation (MGAC) was founded as the Woomera Aboriginal Corporation in 1973, which was incorporated in 1983. It adopted its present name in 2009, at the same time establishing three discrete business units: MIDance, MIArt and MI Festival. The buildings were upgraded in 2010–11, including the addition of a dedicated studio for the artists.

Art centre

Mornington Island Art (MIArt), owned and run by the Mirndiyan Gununa Aboriginal Corporation, is one of the oldest Indigenous Australian art centres in Australia.

People of the islands started making artefacts and bark paintings using natural ochres in the 1950s, later using acrylic paint on bark, and started selling their work in the 1970s. In the mid-1980s Mornington Island Art and Craft(s) (MIAAC) was established by Brett Evans, with a new building and a dedicated coordinator.

Some of the women from the Kaiadilt "old ladies' camp" established on Bentinck Island in the 1980s and 1990s, after moving to Mornington Island again in the 21st century, formed the Kaiadilt art movement, led by Sally Gabori (1924–2015). Evans established MIAAC to produce and market traditional crafts, including Gabori's fine weaving. The Kaiadilt community had no two-dimensional art traditions before 2005.

In 2002, Mornington Island Art and Craft became part of Woomera Aboriginal Corporation.

The art centre incorporates the MIArt studio and a gallery. The artists, both men and women, work in many different mediums and represent their Lardil and Kaiadilt cultures in their artwork, and exhibitions by the artists have been mounted in Brisbane and Darwin. Two of the most well-known artists to have worked in the art centre are Sally Gabori and Dick Roughsey, and members of their families continue to work at the centre. The manager of the art centre  is John Armstrong, while the gallery manager is Bereline Loogatha.

The art centre works with Kaiadilt elders to help revive their language and culture.

Mornington Island Dancers
There is also a significant history of performance on the island, and the Mornington Island Dancers was one of the earliest established Aboriginal performing arts groups in Australia. They performed publicly in Cairns in August 1964, and again in 1973 at the opening ceremony of the Sydney Opera House. Since 2009 and  the dancers operate as a business unit of MGAC called MIDance.

The dancers celebrate Lardil culture through traditional dance and song. They have toured overseas many times, including in Italy, France, Germany, Luxembourg, the United States, United Kingdom, India and Sweden.

Education 
Mornington Island State School is a government primary and secondary (Early Childhood-10) school for boys and girls at Lardil Street. In 2018, the school had an enrolment of 263 students with 25 teachers and 14 non-teaching staff (11 full-time equivalent). It includes a special education program. The school works with the art centre and Kaiadilt elders to help revive their language and culture.

There are no schools offering education to Year 12 on the island; non are there any nearby. Distance education or boarding school would be the only options.

In literature
Writer Ernestine Hill travelled to Mornington Island and a 1933 photograph she took of the island is held by the University of Queensland's library in their Ernestine Hill collection.

Mornington Island was the site of research over several decades by British anthropologist David McKnight and described in a series of books, People, Countries, and the Rainbow Serpent: Systems of classification among the Lardil of Mornington Island (1999), From Hunting to Drinking: The devastating effects of alcohol on an Australian Aboriginal community (2002), Going the Whiteman’s Way: Kinship and marriage among Australian Aborigines (2004) and Of Marriage, Violence and Sorcery: The quest for power in northern Queensland (2005).

Indigenous art of Mornington Island is described in The Heart of Everything: The art and artists of Mornington & Bentinck Islands, ed. Nicholas Evans, Louise Martin-Chew and Paul Memmott (2008).

According to the Encyclopedia of Marine Mammals (2008), a group of Indigenous Mornington Island people has been communicating with wild Indo-Pacific bottlenose dolphins for millennia. It is said that they have "a medicine man who calls the dolphins and 'speaks' to them telepathically. By these communications he assures that the tribes' fortunes and happiness are maintained".

Alcohol ban
In November 2003 the Government of Queensland implemented an Alcohol Management Plan to 19 Indigenous communities in Queensland where alcohol abuse was rampant, including Mornington Island. The plan restricted tavern opening hours, limits sales to only light and mid-strength beers, bans takeaway alcohol sales and home brewing. Riots broke out when the tough new alcohol laws were introduced. A total ban on alcohol was in place across all foreshores and the 23 islands in the Wellesley, South Wellesley Islands, Forsyth and Bountiful Islands groups and Sweers Island, apart from the Sweers Island Resort.

After the tavern was shut down, locals took to home brewing, and in 2017 Mornington Shire Council called for the ban to be lifted so that alcohol could be better regulated from a single legal outlet. Alcohol continued to be a major social and health problem , and in 2021 the tavern was reopened, which had started to improve the community's relationship with alcohol.

On 16 April 2022, after much consultation with community elders, the island introduced limited, regulated access to liquor. The strategy has been adopted in order to address the problem of harms from people creating potent strength homebrews, as well as sly grogging.

Climate

Mornington Island experiences a tropical savanna climate (Köppen: Aw, Trewartha: Awhb), with a very hot and very humid, yet short wet season from mid-November to mid-April; and a long, warm to hot dry season from mid-April to mid-November with muggy conditions due to its coastal location.

Notable people
 Sally Gabori, artist
 Dick Roughsey, artist
 Charlie Cameron, Australian rules footballer with the Brisbane Lions
 Jarrod Cameron, former Australian rules footballer with the West Coast Eagles

See also

 List of islands of Australia
 Sydney Island

References

External links 

Islands of Queensland
Aboriginal communities in Queensland
Gulf of Carpentaria
Shire of Mornington (Queensland)
Queensland in World War II
Australian Aboriginal missions